Linganore Creek is a  tributary of the Monocacy River in Frederick County, Maryland. The creek runs roughly southwest to the Monocacy River, which drains to the Potomac River. High water in the creek can result in flooding of Gas House Pike, an east–west road running between Monocacy Boulevard and Green Valley Road.

The name "linganore" purportedly means "left ear" (of the Potomac), a name coined by an American Indian chief who once lived on the banks of the waterway.

Lake Linganore
It is also a drinking water source for the central portion of Frederick County. The community of Lake Linganore takes its name from the lake.

See also
List of Maryland rivers

References

External links
Lake Linganore Source Water Protection Plan – Frederick County
Lower Linganore Creek Stream Corridor Assessment Survey (2005) – Maryland Department of Natural Resources & Frederick County
Action Plan for the Linganore Source Water Protection Plan - Frederick County
Monocacy & Catoctin Watershed Alliance

Coordinates

Rivers of Frederick County, Maryland
Rivers of Maryland
Tributaries of the Monocacy River